Zinc finger, DHHC-type containing 14 is a protein that in humans is encoded by the ZDHHC14 gene.

References

Further reading 

 

Genes
Human proteins